Treat Her Like a Lady may refer to:

"Treat Her Like a Lady" (Cornelius Brothers & Sister Rose song), a 1971 song by Cornelius Brothers & Sister Rose
"Treat Her Like a Lady", a 1979 song by Jimmy Buffett and David Loggins from Buffet's album Volcano
"Treat Her Like a Lady" (The Temptations song), a 1984 song by The Temptations from their album Truly for You
"Treat Her Like a Lady" (Diana King song)", a 1995 song by Diana King
 Covered in 1997 by Celine Dion on Let's Talk About Love
"Treat Her Like a Lady" (Joe song)", a 2000 single by Joe on his album My Name Is Joe
"Treat Her Like a Lady", a theatrical production with CeCe Peniston
"Treat Her Like a Lady", a 1967 song by the band Tages (band)

See also
 Like a Lady (disambiguation)
 Treat Me Like a Lady (disambiguation)